The 1974 Canadian-American Challenge Cup was the ninth and final season of the original Can-Am auto racing series.  It consisted of FIA Group 7 racing cars running half hour Sprint races followed by hour-long Cup races.  It began June 16, 1974, and was cancelled after the fifth round on August 25, 1974.

Following the cancellation of the series, many teams turned to the new Camel GT Challenge, although the cars were not of the same type as had been used in Can-Am.  The Can-Am name would return in 1977, although the formula used would vary greatly from the original series, concentrating instead on open-wheel-based chassis.

Schedule
All rounds had a Sprint qualifying heat first to determine the starting order for the Cup event.  The results of the Sprint and Cup were not combined.

Season results

Drivers Championship
Points are awarded to the top ten finishers in the order of 20-15-12-10-8-6-4-3-2-1.

References

 
 

 
Can-Am seasons
Can-Am